XHFL-FM is a radio station in Ciudad Obregón, Sonora, Mexico. Broadcasting on 90.5 FM, XHFL is owned by Uniradio and carries a grupera format known as La Invasora.

History
The concession for the station was issued to Fernando Lema Monge in April 1982. It was formerly owned by Radiorama.

References

Radio stations in Sonora